Konstantin Rachkov (born 8 October 1978) is a Russian rugby union footballer who plays as a fly-half.

He played in France for US Montauban (2001/02-2003/04), Stade Aurillacois Cantal Auvergne (2004/05), Lyon OU (2005/06), Tarbes Pyrénées Rugby (2006/07), Avenir Valencien (2007/08), Provence Rugby (2008/09-2009/10) and Rugby Club Stade Phocéen (2010/11-2011/12). He returned to Russia to play for Bulava Taganrog in 2012/13.

He was one of the leading players and top scorers for Russia, from 1997 to 2011, with 44 caps and 10 tries, 51 conversions, 36 penalties and 10 drop goals, 316 points on aggregate. Rachkov was part of the Russian squad at the 2011 Rugby World Cup. He played in all the four games, scoring 1 try, 4 conversions, 1 penalty and 1 drop goal, 19 points on aggregate. He left the National Team after the competition.

References

External links

2011 Rugby World Cup Profile

1978 births
Living people
Kazakhstani rugby union players
Russian rugby union players
Russia international rugby union players
Rugby union fly-halves
Stade Aurillacois Cantal Auvergne players
Lyon OU players
Tarbes Pyrénées Rugby players
Russian expatriate rugby union players
Russian expatriate sportspeople in France
Kazakhstani expatriate sportspeople in France
Kazakhstani expatriate rugby union players
Expatriate rugby union players in France
Provence Rugby players
Sportspeople from Almaty
US Montauban players